Han Guanghui (born 24 January 1988) is a Chinese footballer of Korean descent who currently plays for Chengdu Rongcheng as left winger or left-back.

Club career
Han Guanghui was born in Yanji, Jilin before moving to Beijing to join Beijing BIT during the 2008 season. He was actively encouraged to by his club to finish his degree in International trade while participating in the second tier of the Chinese pyramid. After eight seasons he would establish himself as a vital member of the team until at the end of the 2015 China League One season the club was relegated and Han was allowed to leave.

Han would return to Jilin to join top tier club Yanbian FC on 13 January 2016. On 8 May 2016, he made his debut for Yanbian in the 2016 Chinese Super League against Changchun Yatai, coming on as a substitute for Kim Seung-dae in the 92nd minute. He would score his first goal for the club on 11 May 2016 in a Chinese FA Cup game against Lijiang Jiayunhao that ended in a 1-1 draw before being settled on penalties, which    
Yanbian lost. At the end of the 2017 Chinese Super League season Yanbian were relegated, Han remained loyal and stayed with the club.

On 26 February 2019, Yanbian was dissolved due to owing taxes and Han was allowed to join third tier club Zibo Cuju. The following season he would join second tier club Shaanxi Chang'an Athletic. After only one season Han moved to another second tier club Chengdu Rongcheng where he would establish himself as a regular within the team and aid them to promotion at the end of the 2021 league campaign.

Career statistics
Statistics accurate as of match played 8 January 2023.

References

External links
 

1988 births
Living people
Chinese footballers
People from Yanbian
Yanbian Funde F.C. players
Shaanxi Chang'an Athletic F.C. players
Chinese Super League players
China League One players
China League Two players
Chinese people of Korean descent
Association football wingers
Association football defenders